Pod Pajštúnom is a nature reserve in the Slovak municipalities of Stupava and Borinka in the Malacky District. It has a protection level of 5 under the Slovak nature protection system. The nature reserve is part of the Little Carpathians Protected Landscape Area.

Description
The nature reserve was created to protect forest communities of beech, oak-hornbeam and lime-maple with their natural species composition and structure as well as the protection of pioneer and subpannonic grass-herb stands on carbonate substrate.

References

Geography of Bratislava Region
Protected areas of Slovakia
Protected areas established in 1984